Coal Bank Pass, elevation , is a mountain pass in the San Juan Mountains of western Colorado in the United States. The pass is in the San Juan National Forest.

Route
The pass is traversed by the Million Dollar Highway, U.S. Highway 550 south of Silverton, which is part of the San Juan Skyway Scenic Byway. While the north side is fairly gentle, the descent on the south side is very steep (6.5%), and has a runaway truck ramp for trucks that lose control. It is basically downhill the entire way to Durango.

References

Mountain passes of Colorado
Landforms of San Juan County, Colorado
San Juan Mountains (Colorado)
San Juan National Forest
Transportation in San Juan County, Colorado
U.S. Route 50